Gaddampally is a village in Mahbubnagar district of Andhra Pradesh. It is located 10.5 km from Nagar Kurnool and 120 km from Hyderabad, India. It is around 56 km from the District headquarters Mahbubnagar. The village pincode is 509385.

Notes 

Villages in Mahbubnagar district